Ekaterina Valeryevna Lee (Ekaterina Valeryevna Li) is a Russian singer-songwriter and fashion designer, professionally known as Katya Lee (Катя Ли), or KATYA.

Life and career

Hi-Fi–(2006-2010) 
She began her career in 2006, after being discovered by a producer, while singing in a nightclub in Saint-Petersburg. The next day she was flown to Moscow, where she became a member of the pop/dance band Hi-Fi.

Fabrika–(2010-2014) 
In 2010, KATYA left Hi-Fi after being invited to join the all-girl pop act Fabrika (Фабрика), which was enjoying a period of large-scale success. As a member of Fabrika, KATYA was featured in worldwide media, including Billboard, Play Boy, Rolling Stone, FHM, Hello, Ok, Grazia, Maxim, Star hit, and others. Fabrika performed at: TV music series "The Treasure of the Nation" on channel 2 Russia, TV Show Star Factory on Channel 1 Russia, Saturday Night Live Channel 2 Russia, Comedy Club on TNT Channel Russia, Music Box Russia, MTV Russia, STS Russia, REN-TV Russia.

In 2010 KATYA started designing clothes for Fabrika.

2014–present 
In 2014 she is leaving the group and moved to New York to work on her solo career after releasing the single "Ne rodis krasivoy" single which got nominated for and won a Golden Gramophone award in 2014.(Russian version of Grammys awards)

Her first performance in the United States was at Blue Note café in New York's West Village performing her original compositions. She later performed at Cielo nightclub in NYC's meatpacking district, Output in Brooklyn's trendy Williamsburg, followed by numerous other performances including Burning Man 2015 and then again at Burning Man 2016 on the White Ocean stage.

KATYA is currently working on a Solo EP with Ryan Guldemond of Mother Mother and 2-time Grammy-winning Producer Matt Shane.

Discography 

 Vzletai (Взлетай) 2006
 Po sledam (По следам) 2006
 Pravo na schastie ( Право на счастье ) 2007
 Nam pora (Нам пора) 2008
 Mi ne angeli (Мы не ангелы) 2008
 Sedmoi lepestok Remix (Седьмой лепесток) 2008
 Zabitii sentyabr (Забытый сентябрь) 2009
 Ali-Baba (Али-Баба) 2009
 Zaceluu (Я тебя зацелую) 2010
 Ostanovki (Остановки) 2011
 Ona eto ja (Она это я) 2012
 Filmi o lubvi (Фильмы о любви) 2012
 Ne rods krasivoi (Не родись красивой) 2013
 Same Side 2015
 Lovely Day 2015
 Little Phoenix 2015
 A Dream 2016

References

External links 
 Katya Lee Official website
 Cover Story of Collective Hub Magazine Australia
 Paparazzi magazine online version
 News in Hello Magazine Russia
 Freak of Russian pop 
  Cover story for XXL magazine Russia

Living people
Russian pop singers
Russian fashion designers
21st-century Russian singers
21st-century Russian women singers
1984 births
Russian women fashion designers